(1569? – January 23, 1633) was a member of the Japanese delegation to European Christendom, also known as the Tenshō embassy. Later, he abandoned the Christian faith. However the recent discovery of a rosary in his graveyard made public on September 8, 2017 has cast doubt upon his apostasy.

In popular media
A "brother Michael" appears in the 1975 novel Shōgun. 
In its adaptation to TV, Michael is played by Masumi Okada.
In the 1996 Portuguese film Os Olhos da Ásia, Miguel is played by Yasukiyo Umeno.
In Tenshō Kennō Shōnen Shisetsu, Miguel is played by Ryouta Murai. In the 2019 miniseries MAGI Tensho Keno Shonen Shisetsu, Miguel is played by Atsushi Ogata.

References

Japanese Roman Catholics
1633 deaths
1560s births
Members of the Tenshō embassy